The following is a list of dock applications.

Application launchers
Lists of software